Fernando Luís (born 9 March 1961 in Setúbal) is a Portuguese actor. Notable appearances include Médico de Família, A minha família é uma animação, A Minha Sogra é Uma Bruxa, Inspector Max and Noite Escura.

He was active at the Teatro Animação de Setúbal. In 1992, he received the award for Best Actor by the Portuguese Association of Theatre Critics (Associação Portuguesa de Críticos de Teatro) in the play The Threepenny Opera by Bertolt Brecht. Luís then starred on stage at the Teatro Maria Matos, Teatro da Cornucópia, Teatro Aberto, amongst others, in plays of Brecht, Eugene O'Neill, Ray Bradbury, Turgenev, Manuel Teixeira Gomes or Hélia Correia. He was directed by names such as João Canijo, Diogo Infante, Fernando Gomes, João Brites, Filipe La Féria, José Caldas, Jorge Lavelli, Carlos Avilez and Graça Correia.

He made his film debut in Rosa Negra, de Margarida Gil (1992). Since then, he has participated in films by directors such as Marco Martins, Manuel Mozos, Margarida Cardoso and José de Sá Caetano. He was directed by João Canijoin Sapatos Pretos (1998), Noite Escura (2004) and Mal Nascida (2007).

Luís is active in regular television series, and joined the cast of O Mandarim (1990), Alentejo Sem Lei (1990), Polícias (1996), Médico de Família (1998–2000), A minha família é uma animação (2001–2002), A Minha Sogra é Uma Bruxa (2002–2003), Inspector Max (2003–2005/2016-2017), Nome de Código: Sintra (2005–2006), Bocage (2006), A Minha Família (2006–2007), Doida Por Ti (2012–2013), Sol de Inverno (2014), Jardins Proibidos (2014–2015), and A Impostora (2016-2017).

References

External links
 

1961 births
Living people
Portuguese male film actors
Portuguese male stage actors
Portuguese male voice actors
People from Lisbon
20th-century Portuguese male actors
21st-century Portuguese male actors